Dolly Roll was a Hungarian pop band, which was established in 1983 from the ex-members of the band Hungária. Their first LP, Vakáció-ó-ó sold 250 thousand copies within two months. In 1984, they went on a tour in Hungary, performing in 50 places. They released a new album every year. In both 1986-87 and 1992 the band when through some changes in membership. In 1998, they held a concert in Budapest Sportcsarnok. In 2017, their lead singer, Dolly announced, that the band will cease to perform. Throughout their first thirty years, they sold more than five million records.

Members

Discography 
 Vakáció-ó-ó (1983)
 Eldoradoll (1984)
 Happy cocktail (1985)
 Oh-la-la (1986)
 Játék az élet (1987)
 Zakatol a szív (1988)
 Országúti randevú (1988) (compilation)
 Dupla vagy semmi (1989)
 Ábrándos szép napok (1989)
 Ébreszd fel a szívemet (1990)
 Rég volt, szép volt (1990)
 Gondolsz-e majd rám (1991)
 Rock & Roll-ra Hívlak! (1992)
 Beat turmix '60 1 (1993)
 Tipi-Tapi Dinó (1993)
 Simogass napsugár (1993) (compilation)
 Beat turmix '60 2 (1994)
 Tipi-Tapi Party (1994)
 Dolly Roll Gold (1995) (compilation)
 Atlanta Rá-rá-rá, hajrá!!! (1996)
 Tipi-Tapi Csodaországban (1997)
 Dolly Roll ReMix '98 (1998) (compilation)
 Vakáció-ó-ó '98 (1998) (live album)
 Poperett (1999)
 Dolly Jubileumi Koncert (2003) (live album)
 Plussz... (2005)
 Karácsony (2009)
 Emlékszel még - Best Of (2009) (compilation)

References 
 Dolly Roll allmusic.hu
 Nincs többé Dolly Roll 24.hu, 2017.02.12.

External links 
 
 Discogs

Hungarian pop music groups